Henry Starr Harrison (12 April 1883 – 8 December 1971) was an English first-class cricketer active 1907–23 who played for Surrey (awarded county cap 1911). He was born in Cheam and died in Bognor Regis.

References

1883 births
1971 deaths
English cricketers
Surrey cricketers
Players of the South cricketers